Eupithecia basurmanca is a moth in the family Geometridae. It is found in Iran (Mazandaran).

The wingspan is about 22 mm. The forewings are ochreous brown. The hindwings are paler, ochreous brownish, darkened to the terminal area.

Etymology
The species name is derived from Basurmanca (or basurmanka), an old popular and literary Russian word, which means a woman adherent to a different faith (or also stranger per Russian history).

References

Moths described in 2012
basurmanca
Moths of the Middle East